María Elena Cano Ayala (born 20 April 1955) is a Mexican politician affiliated with the PRI. She served as a federal deputy of the LXII Legislature of the Mexican Congress representing Guanajuato, and previously served as a local deputy in the LVII and LXI Legislatures of the Congress of Guanajuato.

References

1955 births
Living people
Politicians from Guanajuato
Women members of the Chamber of Deputies (Mexico)
Institutional Revolutionary Party politicians
20th-century Mexican politicians
20th-century Mexican women politicians
21st-century Mexican politicians
21st-century Mexican women politicians
Members of the Congress of Guanajuato
Universidad de Guanajuato alumni
Deputies of the LXII Legislature of Mexico
Members of the Chamber of Deputies (Mexico) for Guanajuato